Zyber Konçi (1 January 1927 – 19 January 2015) was a coach of the Albania national football team.

Managerial career
He had two spells as Albania's coach, in 1963-65 and 1980. He was the first coach to lead Albania in the qualifiers of a major tournament, those of the 1964 European Nations' Cup, where he also obtained the first victory for Albania in such tournaments' qualifiers, against Denmark.

He was the coach that played the youngest player ever on the Albania national team, Dinamo's Iljaz Çeço, in a friendly against Algeria on October 11, 1964 finished in a 1-1 draw.

Personal life and death
Professor Dr. Zyber Konçi was educated in Czechoslovakia and introduced scientific methods at the Albanian Institute of Physical Culture and Sports; he also was the founder of the famous Shkëndija Tiranë football academy, which produced many Albanian football talents. He died on 19 January 2015, at the age of 88.

References

External links
 

1927 births
2015 deaths
Sportspeople from Tirana
Albanian football managers
FK Dinamo Tirana managers
Albania national football team managers
KF Tirana managers